Hohes Kreuz is a municipality in the Eichsfeld in Thuringia, Germany. The municipality was created in 1991 by merging the municipalities of Bischhagen, Mengelrode, Siemerode, and Streitholz.

References

Eichsfeld (district)